Leon Russell and the Shelter People is the second solo album by the singer-songwriter and multi-instrumentalist Leon Russell, released in 1971. It peaked at number 17 on the Billboard Hot 200 in the United States. The album has gold certification for sales of over 500,000 albums in the US and Canada.

"The Ballad of Mad Dogs and Englishmen" is a song written by Leon Russell from the soundtrack of the 1971 film Mad Dogs & Englishmen.

The Shelter People referenced in the album title are the session musicians for Shelter, the label founded by Russell and Denny Cordell in 1969. However, only five of the album's eleven tracks are credited to them. Of the remaining tracks, two are credited to the "Muscle Shoals Swampers", two to "Friends In England" and one to "Tulsa Tops". "The Ballad of Mad Dogs and Englishmen" features only Russell on vocals and piano with a string backing.

Reception

In a review for Allmusic, the critic Mike DeGagne called "The Ballad of Mad Dogs and Englishmen" the highlight of the album and wrote, "On the whole, Leon Russell and the Shelter People is an entertaining and more importantly, revealing exposition of Russell's music when he was in his prime. ... Carney is an introspective piece which holds up a little better from a songwriting standpoint, but this album does a better job at bearing his proficiency as a well-rounded musician."

Track listing
All tracks composed by Leon Russell except where indicated

Side One
"Stranger in a Strange Land" (Russell, Don Preston) – 3:58
"Of Thee I Sing" (Russell, Don Preston) – 4:21
"A Hard Rain's a-Gonna Fall" (Bob Dylan) – 5:10
"Crystal Closet Queen" – 2:57
"Home Sweet Oklahoma" – 3:25
"Alcatraz" – 3:50

Side Two
"The Ballad of Mad Dogs and Englishmen" – 3:55
"It Takes a Lot to Laugh, It Takes a Train to Cry" (Dylan) – 3:47
"She Smiles Like a River" – 2:56
"Sweet Emily" – 3:19
"Beware of Darkness" (George Harrison) – 4:34

The CD re-issue contains the following bonus tracks:
"It's All Over Now, Baby Blue" (Dylan) – 3:38
"Love Minus Zero/No Limit" (Dylan) – 3:19
 "She Belongs to Me" (Dylan) – 3:26

Charts

Personnel
Leon Russell – lead vocals, guitar (1, 2, 4-6, 8, 10, 11), piano, Hammond organ (1, 2, 4, 8, 10)
Jim Price – Hammond organ (5, 6, 11)
John Gallie – Hammond organ (1, 2, 4, 8, 10)
Barry Beckett – Hammond organ (9)
Jim Keltner – drums (3, 12-14)
Chuck Blackwell – drums (1, 2, 4, 8, 10)
Jim Gordon – drums (5, 6, 11)
Roger Hawkins – drums (9)
David Hood – bass guitar (9)
Carl Radle – bass guitar (1-7, 10-14)
Don Preston – guitar (1-4, 8, 10, 12-14), backing vocals (1, 2, 4, 8, 10)
Joey Cooper – guitar (1, 2, 4, 8, 10), vocals (1, 2, 4, 8, 10)
Claudia Lennear – backing vocals (1, 2, 4 ,8, 10)
Kathi McDonald – backing vocals (1, 2, 4 ,8, 10)
Jesse Ed Davis – guitar (3, 12-14)
Chris Stainton – guitar (5, 6, 11)
Jimmy Johnson – guitar (9)

Production
Leon Russell – producer
Denny Cordell – producer
Terry Manning – Moog programmer, engineer
Glyn Johns – engineer (7)
Andy Johns – engineer (5, 6, 11)
Nick DeCaro – string arrangements (7)

Covers
"Alcatraz" – was covered by Jesse Ed Davis on his 1972 album Ululu
"Alcatraz" – was covered by Nazareth on their 1973 album Razamanaz

References

Leon Russell albums
1971 albums
Albums produced by Denny Cordell
A&M Records albums
Shelter Records albums
Albums produced by Leon Russell
Albums recorded at A&M Studios
Albums recorded at Muscle Shoals Sound Studio